Reign of the Malicious is the debut full-length album by Nachtmystium.

Originally released on CD November 9, 2002 by Regimental Records (limited to 666) and LP by Sombre Records (limited to 350).

Tape version released by Asgard Musik on August 27, 2003 (limited to 500
copies).

Reissued with the Self-Titled EP on one CD by Desire of Goat Productions in 2005 (limited to
500 copies)

Reissued in 2005 as a Pic-Disc by Ahdistuksen Aihio Productions.

Reissued by Candlelight Records in 2008 with alternative cover art.

Track listing

Production
Recorded in the winter of 2001 at Studio Hate
Mixed and engineered by Azentrius

Personnel
Azentrius - guitars, bass and vocals
Session member - drums
Zmij - vocals on "Under the Horns of Darkness"
M.M.K. - bass on "Under the Horns of Darkness"
Grave - drums on "Under the Horns of Darkness"

Additional personnel
 Christophe Szpajdel — logo

External links
 Nachtmystium Website
 Reign of the Malicious on Encyclopaedia Metallum
 Nachtmystium Interview

Nachtmystium albums
2002 debut albums
Southern Lord Records albums